Phylloceras is an extinct genus of ammonoid cephalopods belonging to the family Phylloceratidae. These nektonic carnivores lived from Early Jurassic (Hettangian age) to Late Cretaceous (Maastrichtian age) (from 201.30 to 66.043 Ma).

Description
These primitive ammonites had an involute, laterally flattened shell with a regular shell opening. They were almost smooth and the ornamentation was virtually absent or, at most, represented by simple growth lines barely visible. The striking sinuous suture lines were characteristic of this genus. They are reminiscent, in some ways, of the leaves of plants (hence the name Phylloceras, which means " leaf-horn").

Distribution
Fossils of species within this genus have been found all over the world, particularly in Western Europe.

References

 Cyril Walker & David Ward (1993) - Fossielen: Sesam Natuur Handboeken, Bosch & Keuning, Baarn. 

Jurassic ammonites
Cretaceous ammonites
Ammonites of Europe
Hettangian genus first appearances
Sinemurian genera
Pliensbachian genera
Toarcian genera
Aalenian genera
Bajocian genera
Bathonian genera
Callovian genera
Oxfordian genera
Kimmeridgian genera
Tithonian genera
Berriasian genera
Valanginian genera
Hauterivian genera
Barremian genera
Aptian genera
Albian genera
Cenomanian genera
Turonian genera
Coniacian genera
Santonian genera
Campanian genera
Maastrichtian genus extinctions
Ammonites of South America
Paja Formation
Hasle Formation